Undifferentiated connective tissue disease (UCTD) is a disease in which the body mistakenly attacks its own tissues. It is diagnosed when there is evidence of an existing autoimmune condition which does not meet the criteria for any specific autoimmune disease, such as systemic lupus erythematosus or scleroderma. Latent lupus and incomplete lupus are alternative terms that have been used to describe this condition.

The term is sometimes used interchangeably with mixed connective tissue disease, an overlap syndrome. However, MCTD is thought by some researchers to be a clinically distinct entity and is strongly associated with the presence of high titers of ribonucleoprotein (RNP) antibodies.

It is estimated that up to 25 percent of people with systemic autoimmune disease could be considered to have UCTD.

Signs and symptoms

Disease presentation varies widely from patient to patient, as UCTD is by definition nonspecific. Symptoms typically include constitutional complaints that are common to connective tissue diseases such as fatigue, a general sense of feeling unwell, and fever.
Other symptoms associated with UCTD include:
 dry eyes
 dry mouth
 hair loss
 joint inflammation
 joint pain
 oral ulcers
 positive ANA test
 raynaud's phenomenon
 sun sensitive rash

Clinical presentation in some people diagnosed with UCTD may show: 
 a decrease in white blood cell count in the blood
 anemia
 abnormal nerve sensations in the extremities
 inflammation of the lining of the heart and/or lungs
 a decrease in platelet count

Lung involvement, such as nonspecific interstitial pneumonia, is a possible disease complication.

Diagnosis

There is no official diagnostic criteria for UCTD. Diagnostic testing generally aims to determine whether a patient has a definite or undifferentiated connective tissue disease.

Treatment
Treatment largely depends upon individual disease progression and the nature of presenting symptoms. Antimalarials, corticosteroids, and other drugs may be prescribed, if deemed appropriate by the treating physician.

Prognosis

Most patients will maintain a diagnosis of undifferentiated connective tissue disease. However, about one third of UCTD patients will differentiate to a specific autoimmune disease, like rheumatoid arthritis or systemic sclerosis. About 12 percent of patients will go into remission.

Severe vitamin D deficiency has been associated with the progression of UCTD into defined connective tissue diseases. The presence of the autoantibodies anti-dsDNA, anti-Sm, and anti-cardiolipin has been shown to correlate with the development of systemic lupus erythematosus, specifically.

References

External links 

Autoimmune diseases
Connective tissue diseases
Systemic connective tissue disorders